The International Journal of Biostatistics is a biannual peer-reviewed scientific journal covering biostatistics. It was established in 2005 and is published by Walter de Gruyter. Its editors-in-chief are Antoine Chambaz (Université Paris Descartes), Alan Hubbard (University of California, Berkeley), and Mark van der Laan (University of California, Berkeley). According to the Journal Citation Reports, the journal has a 2017 impact factor of 0.840.

References

External links

Publications established in 2005
Biannual journals
De Gruyter academic journals
Biostatistics journals
English-language journals